Crystal is a census-designated place (CDP) comprising the main community in Crystal Township, Montcalm County, Michigan, United States. The CDP includes the village proper of Crystal, at the east end of Crystal Lake, as well as all of the land surrounding the lake.

Crystal was first listed as a CDP prior to the 2020 census.

Demographics

References 

Census-designated places in Montcalm County, Michigan
Census-designated places in Michigan
Unincorporated communities in Michigan
Unincorporated communities in Montcalm County, Michigan